Sinan Kurt may refer to:

 Sinan Kurt (footballer, born 1995), German football midfielder for Adana Demirspor
 Sinan Kurt (footballer, born 1996), German football winger